The Tailhook Association is a U.S.-based non-profit fraternal organization supporting the interests of sea-based aviation, with emphasis on aircraft carriers. The word tailhook refers to the hook underneath the tail of the aircraft that catches the arresting wire suspended across the flight deck in order to stop the landing plane quickly.

History

Establishment 
The Tailhook Association was formed by active-duty naval aviators in 1956, eventually growing into a national organization headquartered in San Diego, California.  During the Vietnam War, the annual Tailhook reunion and symposium also served to provide opportunities for aircrews from the Pacific and Atlantic Fleets to exchange information about events in Southeast Asia. The association evolved into an independent, non-profit organization dedicated to building camaraderie among those that have been a part of the Naval Aviation team. The purpose of the association is to foster, encourage, develop, study and support the aircraft carrier and sea-based aircraft and aircrews. 

The Tailhook Educational Foundation (TEF) was created in 1992 to educate the nation's public with regard to the history and present day activities of the US Navy carrier aviation community. TEF is a separate non-profit that works closely with, and in support of, the Tailhook Association, providing over 100 scholarships per year to Naval Aviation legacies.

The Tailhook scandal 

In September 1991, the 35th annual symposium in Las Vegas featured a two-day debriefing on Navy and Marine Corps aviation in Operation Desert Storm.  It was the largest such meeting yet held, with 4,000 attendees including active, reserve, and retired personnel. According to a Department of Defense (DoD) report, 83 women and 7 men stated that they had been victims of sexual assault and harassment during the meeting.  Several participants later stated that a number of flag officers attending the meetings were aware of the sexual assaults, but did nothing to stop them.

The issues were never settled, and as late as 2002, the Tailhook chairman spoke dismissively of "the alleged misconduct that occurred in 1991".

Frontline on PBS reported:
Ultimately the careers of fourteen admirals and almost 300 naval aviators were scuttled or damaged by Tailhook. For example, Secretary of the Navy H. Lawrence Garrett III and CNO Admiral Frank Kelso were both at Tailhook '91. Garrett ultimately resigned and Kelso retired early two years after the convention.

Author Jean Zimmerman developed the thesis that the scandal underscored the shifting status of women in the US military and particularly the role of women in combat.

Activities 
Among the Tailhook programs are publication of the quarterly journal The Hook, addressing historical and current events coverage; college scholarships via the Tailhook Educational Foundation; and local/regional "ready rooms" for  active and retired members who support fleet activities.

Some visitors to US Navy aircraft carriers who joined or left the ship on a Carrier Onboard Delivery aircraft are issued "Tailhook certificates" by the Navy, commending them for "NAFOD and intestinal fortitude."

Awards

James D. "Jig Dog" Ramage Award

Tailhooker Of The Year Award

Lifetime Achievement Award

The Hook Magazine Contributor of the Year

Honorary Tailhooker of the Year
(Sponsored by the Boeing Company)

References

Further reading
 
 
 :de:Tailhook-Skandal

1956 establishments in the United States
Non-profit organizations based in San Diego
United States military support organizations
United States Navy support organizations
Military scandals
Organizations established in 1956